Winlaton may refer to:

Winlaton, a village in County Durham, England
Winlaton, Victoria, a village in Victoria, Australia
Winlaton Youth Training Centre, a youth correctional facility in Victoria, Australia